Kogen may refer to:

People 
 Arnie Kogen, American TV comedy writer and producer and longtime writer for Mad Magazine
 Jay Kogen (born 1963), American comedy writer, son of Arnie Kogen
 Emperor Kōgen (278–153 BC), eighth emperor of Japan

Other uses 
 Kōgen, an era of Japanese history from October 1256 to March 1257
 Kōgen Prefecture, an administrative division of Korea under Japanese rule corresponding to the historical Gangwon Province

See also 
 
 Kogan
 Kohen

Kohenitic surnames
Jewish surnames
Surnames of Russian origin
Yiddish-language surnames